Jorn van Hedel (born 13 April 2001) is a Dutch professional footballer who plays as a right-back for Eerste Divisie club FC Den Bosch.

Club career
Born in Berlicum, Van Hedel started his career in the youth of local club BMC, before moving the FC Den Bosch academy. In April 2014, he joined talent academy Brabant United, before making the move back to the Den Bosch youth system in 2017. He was promoted to the first team in the summer of 2020, after having played two seasons for the U21 team in the Hoofdklasse, among others. He made his full senior debut in the Eerste Divisie on 6 September 2020, in the 2–1 home win over FC Dordrecht. He started at right back and played the full match.

References

External links
 
 

2000 births
Living people
Dutch footballers
Association football defenders
People from Sint-Michielsgestel
FC Den Bosch players
Vierde Divisie players
Eerste Divisie players
Footballers from North Brabant